Arnold Gjergjaj (born 8 October 1984) is a Swiss professional boxer. In 2014 he won the EBU-EE version of the European heavyweight title, becoming the first boxer fighting under a Swiss license to do so.

Boxing career
Gjergjaj began as a wrestler from a young age and later moved to kickboxing before taking up boxing.  A three-time Swiss amateur champion, he turned professional at the age of 25 and made his debut in 2009. For the majority of his career he has fought low level opposition in Switzerland, building up an undefeated record of 29-0 with 21 knockouts.

Gjergjaj is trained by Angelo Gallina, who is also his manager. He has trained with world champions such as Vitali and Wladimir Klitschko, Tyson Fury and other top fighters as a sparring partner. He also learned in training sessions under the now deceased legendary German boxing coach Fritz Sdunek. He cites British former undisputed heavyweight world champion Lennox Lewis as his boxing idol.  Gjergjaj won the EBU-EE European heavyweight title in October 2014, beating Adnan Redzovic by a knockout in the 9th round. He defended his title against Denis Bakhtov in June 2015, winning on points despite suffering a broken hand and burst eardrum, and being knocked down in the fifth round for the first time in his career.

On 30 March 2016, it was announced that Gjergjaj would be the second opponent of former champion David Haye since Haye made his return to boxing after a three-year layoff. The fight, which was the biggest of Gjergjaj career to date, took place at The O2 Arena in London on 21 May 2016. Haye received criticism from some fans for picking a second relatively unknown and moderately ranked opponent. However, Gjergjaj was ranked 24th in the world on the independent platform Boxrec before the match with Haye, and at no. 8 in Europe by the EBU. Haye stopped Gjergjaj in the second round via TKO, after having put him on the canvas three times before the referee stopped the fight.

Personal life 
Gjergjaj was born in Gjakova, Kosovo and he moved to Pratteln, Basel in Switzerland with his family when he was 14 years old. After graduating from school he trained as a heating engineer. Gjergjaj married his wife Marta in August 2014 in Pratteln. He has been involved in fields such as developmental aid organization Terre des Hommes Switzerland and has shown commitment to helping the youth in his hometown, where he opened his own boxing club "Arnold Boxfit" on 23 January 2016.

Professional boxing record

|style="text-align:center;" colspan="9"|33 fights, 31 wins (23 knockouts), 2 losses
|-style="text-align:center;background:#e3e3e3;"
|style="border-style:none none solid solid;"|
|style="border-style:none none solid solid;"|Result
|style="border-style:none none solid solid;"|Record
|style="border-style:none none solid solid;"|Opponent
|style="border-style:none none solid solid;"|Type
|style="border-style:none none solid solid;"|Round, time
|style="border-style:none none solid solid;"|Date
|style="border-style:none none solid solid;"|Location
|style="border-style:none none solid solid;"|Notes
|-align=center
|33
|Win
|31-2
|align=left| Gogita Gorgiladze
|KO
|2 (8), 1:12
|1 Sep 2018
|align=left| 
|align=left|
|-align=center
|32
|Loss
|30-2
|align=left| Sean Turner
|KO
|8 (8), 1:45
|9 Dec 2017
|align=left| 
|align=left|
|-align=center
|31
|Win
|30-1
|align=left| Jasmin Hasic
|TKO
|5 (8), 1:00
|17 Dec 2016
|align=left| 
|align=left|
|-align=center
|30
|Loss
|29-1
|align=left| David Haye
|TKO
|2 (10), 1:35
|21 May 2016
|align=left| 
|align=left|
|-align=center
|29
|Win
|29-0
|align=left| Marino Goles
|TKO
|1 (8), 0:45
|5 Dec 2015
|align=left| 
|align=left|
|-align=center
|28
|Win
|28-0
|align=left| Denis Bakhtov
|UD
|12
|6 Jun 2015
|align=left| 
|align=left|
|-align=center
|27
|Win
|27-0
|align=left| Zoltan Csala
|UD
|8
|27 Feb 2015
|align=left| 
|align=left|
|-align=center
|26
|Win
|26-0
|align=left| Adnan Redzovic
|KO
|9 (12), 2:50
|4 Oct 2014
|align=left| 
|align=left|
|-align=center
|25
|Win
|25-0
|align=left| Tibor Balogh
|TKO
|2 (8), 2:20
|9 Jun 2014
|align=left| 
|align=left|
|-align=center
|24
|Win
|24-0
|align=left| Emilio Zarate
|KO
|7 (8)
|15 Mar 2014
|align=left| 
|align=left|
|-align=center
|23
|Win
|23-0
|align=left| Gilberto Domingos
|TKO
|1 (8), 2:15
|26 Dec 2013
|align=left| 
|align=left|
|-align=center
|22
|Win
|22-0
|align=left| Nelson Dominguez
|KO
|3 (8), 2:19
|11 May 2013
|align=left| 
|align=left|
|-align=center
|21
|Win
|21-0
|align=left| Janne Katajisto
|KO
|3 (8), 0:20
|23 Mar 2013
|align=left| 
|align=left|
|-align=center
|20
|Win
|20-0
|align=left| Yury Bykhautsou
|TKO
|3 (8), 2:10
|26 Dec 2012
|align=left| 
|align=left|
|-align=center
|19
|Win
|19-0
|align=left| Maksym Pedyura
|TKO
|2 (8), 2:50
|1 Dec 2012
|align=left| 
|align=left|
|-align=center
|18
|Win
|18-0
|align=left| Mateusz Malujda
|TKO
|1 (8), 2:03
|20 Oct 2012
|align=left| 
|align=left|
|-align=center
|17
|Win
|17-0
|align=left| Alexander Kahl
|KO
|1 (6), 1:18
|15 Sep 2012
|align=left| 
|align=left|
|-align=center
|16
|Win
|16-0
|align=left| Adnan Buharalija
|TKO
|3 (8), 1:50
|14 Apr 2012
|align=left| 
|align=left|
|-align=center
|15
|Win
|15-0
|align=left| Prince Anthony Ikeji
|KO
|2 (8), 1:38
|17 Dec 2011
|align=left| 
|align=left|
|-align=center
|14
|Win
|14-0
|align=left| Laszlo Toth
|KO
|3 (8)
|12 Nov 2011
|align=left| 
|align=left|
|-align=center
|13
|Win
|13-0
|align=left| Gabor Farkas
|UD
|8
|1 Oct 2011
|align=left| 
|align=left|
|-align=center
|12
|Win
|12-0
|align=left| Ferenc Zsalek
|DQ
|6 (8), 1:50
|20 Aug 2011
|align=left| 
|align=left|
|-align=center
|11
|Win
|11-0
|align=left| Igoris Borucha
|UD
|6
|28 May 2011
|align=left| 
|align=left|
|-align=center
|10
|Win
|10-0
|align=left| Liviu Ungureanu
|TKO
|3 (6), 2:57
|7 May 2011
|align=left| 
|align=left|
|-align=center
|9
|Win
|9-0
|align=left| Pavels Dolgovs
|UD
|6
|5 Feb 2011
|align=left| 
|align=left|
|-align=center
|8
|Win
|8-0
|align=left| Tomasz Zeprzalka
|TKO
|5 (6), 2:40
|18 Dec 2010
|align=left| 
|align=left|
|-align=center
|7
|Win
|7-0
|align=left| Dimitar Stoimenov
|UD
|6
|18 Jul 2010
|align=left| 
|align=left|
|-align=center
|6
|Win
|6-0
|align=left| Gabor Farkas
|TKO
|3 (6)
|29 May 2010
|align=left| 
|align=left|
|-align=center
|5
|Win
|5-0
|align=left| Norbert Sallai
|TKO
|4 (6), 2:25
|17 Apr 2010
|align=left| 
|align=left|
|-align=center
|4
|Win
|4-0
|align=left| Yavor Marinchev
|UD
|6
|26 Mar 2010
|align=left| 
|align=left|
|-align=center
|3
|Win
|3-0
|align=left| Sandor Balogh
|TKO
|6 (6), 2:30
|19 Dec 2009
|align=left| 
|align=left|
|-align=center
|2
|Win
|2-0
|align=left| Zoltan Huffner
|KO
|1 (6), 2:30
|5 Dec 2009
|align=left| 
|align=left|
|-align=center
|1
|Win
|1-0
|align=left| Dariusz Balla
|TKO
|2 (4), 1:01
|29 Aug 2009
|align=left| 
|align=left|
|-align=center

References

Swiss male boxers
Heavyweight boxers
1984 births
Living people